Callopistria repleta is a moth of the family Noctuidae. It is found in India, China, Taiwan, Japan, Peninsular Malaysia, Sumatra and Borneo.

The forewings are contrastingly patterned in white, rufous, dark brown and grey with a mauvish tinge.

The larvae feed on ferns. They are bright green with a series of transverse black bars edged in yellow. Pupation takes place in a slight, earth-covered cocoon on the soil surface.

Subspecies
Callopistria repleta repleta
Callopistria repleta postpallida Prout, 1928 (Sundaland)

References

Moths described in 1858
Caradrinini
Moths of Asia